Reggie Campbell (born August 10, 1985) is an American former football player for the United States Naval Academy team, the Navy Midshipmen. Reggie Campbell is a naval aviator in the United States Navy Reserve.

External links
Navy's bio page
Campbell makes big impact: At 5-6, 165 pounds, Navy slotback defies preconceived notions with speed, power, The Baltimore Sun, August 11, 2006.
Campbell Is Mmm, Mmm Good for Navy, The Washington Post, December 23, 2005.
At Navy, a senior bond; Campbell, Spencer are friends for life, The Washington Times, December 18, 2007.
Campbell leads Navy to 24-3 halftime lead over Army, The Capital, December 1, 2007.
Tiny Problem: Campbell Keeps Navy Going, The Washington Post, October 21, 2005.
Tiny Campbell again slotted for big role with Midshipmen, The Capital, September 6, 2007.
Short Wide Receivers Stand Tall for Navy, The Washington Post, August 11, 2007.

1985 births
Living people
People from Lake Mary, Florida
Sportspeople from Seminole County, Florida
American football wide receivers
Navy Midshipmen football players
United States Navy reservists